Pekka Päivärinta (born 1971) is a Finnish sidecar motorcycle racer, who with passenger Timo Karttiala, was the 2008 Superside FIM World Sidecar Champion. Päivärinta rode a Suzuki GSXR1000 powered LCR as part of Team Suzuki Finland and is the first Finn to win a world sidecar title. Päivärinta also won the 2010, 2011 and 2013 FIM Sidecar World Championship, with Swiss passenger Adolf Hänni and 2016 with Kirsi Kainulainen on a LCR BMW.

Päivärinta is competing in the 2021 FIM Sidecar World Championship with Dutch passenger Ilse De Haas.

References

External links

 Official site
 | FIM Sidecar World Championship

Living people
1971 births
Finnish motorcycle racers
Sidecar racers